The seventh season of the Reborn! anime series is a compilation of episodes that aired from October 10, 2009 to March 27, 2010 on TV Tokyo. Titled as Katekyō Hitman Reborn! in Japan, the Japanese television series is directed by Kenichi Imaizumi, and produced and animated by Artland. The plot, based on the Reborn! manga by Akira Amano, follows Tsuna Sawada, the future boss of the infamous Vongola Mafia family and the battle against the Milliefiore family. In the DVD release, the season is named The Choice Battle. Each of its volumes are labeled "Choice" and the first was released on May 28, 2010 in Japan with five more DVDs slated for release.

Three pieces of theme musics are used for the episodes: one opening theme and two ending themes. The opening theme is "Funny Sunny Day" by SxOxU. The second ending theme is "Gr8 Story" by Sug for the rest of the season.

On March 21, 2009, Japan's d-rights production company collaborated with the anime-streaming website called Crunchyroll in order to begin streaming subbed episodes of the Japanese-dubbed series worldwide. New episodes are available to everyone a week after its airing in Japan.



Episode list

References
General
 
 

Specific

External links
 Official Reborn! website 
 Official anime website 
 TV Tokyo's official anime website 

2009 Japanese television seasons
2010 Japanese television seasons
Season 7